Šárka may refer to one of the following:

 Šárka (name), Czech female given name (includes people bearing the name)
 Šárka, the mythical warrior-maiden of Bohemia, a character in The Maidens' War
 Šárka (Fibich), an opera by Zdeněk Fibich
 Šárka (Janáček), the first opera by Leoš Janáček
 Šárka, the third symphonic poem of Bedřich Smetana's Má vlast
 Divoká Šárka, nature reserve in the Czech Republic